The Pensacola Historic District (also known as the Seville Historic District) is a U.S. historic district (designated as such on September 29, 1970) located in Pensacola, Florida.

The district is roughly bounded by Bayfront Parkway, Tarragona, Romana and Cevallos Streets. Within the district are the Historic Pensacola Village, the T.T. Wentworth Jr. Florida State Museum and Seville Square. Seville Square and its twin Plaza Ferdinand VII were the parade grounds for the Fort of Pensacola established during British rule. In 1559, a site to the northeast of the Pensacola Historic District on the Pensacola Bay is the earliest known European settlement on the North American continent.

Establishment

Pensacola Heritage Foundation 
In the early 1960s, a group of local preservationists led by Pensacolian Mary Turner Rule (née Reed) formed the Pensacola Heritage Foundation, joined the National Trust and surveyed the Seville Square Historic District, the neighborhood around Seville Square adjacent to Pensacola Bay. Realizing the importance of Pensacola's history and the need to save it, Rule and the Heritage Foundation nominated the Pensacola Historic District to be listed on the National Register of Historic Places. The group purchased the Dorr House and restored it. They convinced the city to bring the deteriorated square to its present-day restored state. Then they created a festival, a hometown Victorian picnic in the park, An Evening in Old Seville Square, to bring Pensacolians to the district encouraging restoration. Rule had the famous lighthouse at the Navy Air Station listed on the National Register. She also helped create a state board now called the N.W. Florida Preservation Board, whose function is to protect the Seville Square Historic District and Pensacola's history. The city established the Architecture Review board to protect Pensacola's history locally.

UWF Historic Trust 
In 1967, the Pensacola Historical Preservation and Restoration Commission was founded to preserve the history of Pensacola, including its historic monuments and buildings, to educate the public. In 2001, the organization was repealed by the Florida legislature and its collections and buildings were transferred to the University of West Florida (UWF). In 2009, the Pensacola Heritage Society merged with the organization to become the West Florida Historic Preservation, renamed in 2013 to UWF Historic Trust.

Historic Pensacola Village

Historic Pensacola (located within the Pensacola Historic District) is a collection of 28 historical buildings and museums managed by the University of West Florida's Historic Trust. Historic Pensacola is located in downtown Pensacola, Florida, situated between Plaza Ferdinand VII and Seville Square.

Buildings and museums 
Pensacola Museum of History
Pensacola Children's Museum
Museum of Commerce: a reconstruction of a Pensacola, Florida street scene based on businesses that operated in Pensacola between 1880 and 1910. The Museum consists of twenty properties; some are interpretive history sites. They include stores for toys, leather goods, hardware and music, a print shop, a gas station, and a tram. The print shop contains one of the most complete collections of antique printing presses and type in the Southeast. 
Museum of Industry
Voices of Pensacola Multicultural Center
Old Christ Church
Bowden Building: The lower floor houses classrooms used by the University of West Florida and some of Historic Pensacola's collections. The upper floor houses Historic Pensacola's administration offices.
Tivoli High House: Historic boarding house now used as a ticket office
Lavalle House
Lear-Rocheblave House: Historic home restored to a 1920s boarding house
Dorr House 
Manuel Barrios Cottage
Julee Cottage: Historic home owned by Julee Panton, a free woman of color
Barkley House
John Appleyard Cottage
Fountain Park
Colonial Archaeological Trail
Pensacola Museum of Art

Image gallery

References

External links
 University of West Florida Historic Trust's website
 Historic Pensacola's website
 Pensacola Heritage Foundation's website

Pensacola, Florida
National Register of Historic Places in Escambia County, Florida
Historic districts on the National Register of Historic Places in Florida
Tourist attractions in Pensacola, Florida
Geography of Escambia County, Florida
Museums in Pensacola, Florida
History museums in Florida
Open-air museums in Florida
1970 establishments in Florida